The Juuku is a river in Jeti-Ögüz District of Issyk-Kul Region of Kyrgyzstan. It rises on north slopes of Teskey Ala-Too Range and flows into lake Issyk-Kul near Saruu. Three breakthrough-prone moraine-dammed and moraine glacier-dammed lakes, specifically: Chokoly-Kel, Juukuchak, and Juuka Syrty are located in the river basin upstream at altitudes of 3600 m and above posing a risk of floods.

References

Rivers of Kyrgyzstan
Tributaries of Issyk-Kul